The Artistic Temperament is a British silent motion picture of 1919 produced by David Falcke and directed by Fred Goodwins. It stars Lewis Willoughby, Margot Kelly, and Frank Adair, with Daisy Burrell and Patrick Turnbull.

Premise
After the death of her sister, the heroine (Helen) is pursued by a rich and well-connected man-about-town. However, Helen finds happiness through playing the violin and in the arms of an impoverished artist, whom she marries.

Cast
 
 Lewis Willoughby – John Trevor
 Margot Kelly – Helen Faversham
 Daisy Burrell – 
 Frank Adair – Edward Faversham 
 Patrick Turnbull –

Notes

External links

1919 films
Films set in England
Films directed by Fred Goodwins
British silent feature films
British black-and-white films
1910s English-language films